The 2019–20 West Virginia Mountaineers women's basketball team represented West Virginia University during the 2019–20 NCAA Division I women's basketball season. The Mountaineers were coached by nineteenth-year head coach Mike Carey, played their home games at WVU Coliseum and were members of the Big 12 Conference.

They finished the season 17–12, 7–11 in Big 12 play to finish in a tie for sixth place. The Big 12 Tournament, NCAA women's basketball tournament and WNIT were all cancelled before they began due to the COVID-19 pandemic.

Previous season
The Mountaineers finished the season 22–11, 11–7 in Big 12 play to finish in a tie for fourth place. They lost in the quarterfinals of the Big 12 women's tournament to Kansas State. They received an automatic bid to the Women's National Invitation Tournament where they defeated Rider and Villanova in the first and second rounds before losing to Northwestern in the third round.

Roster

Schedule

|-
!colspan=12 style=| Exhibition

|-
!colspan=12 style=| Non-conference regular season

|-
!colspan=9 style=| Big 12 regular season

|-
!colspan=9 style=| Big 12 Women's Tournament

Rankings

References

West Virginia Mountaineers women's basketball
West Virginia
West Virginia Mountaineers women's basketball
West Virginia Mountaineers women's basketball